Valladolid-Campo Grande railway station serves the Spanish city of Valladolid. It is served by the Madrid–León high-speed rail line to Madrid-Chamartín and regional trains to Santander, Ponferrada and Vitoria-Gasteiz.

Services

References

Valladolid
Railway stations in Castile and León
Buildings and structures in Valladolid